Ras Woldemichael Solomon served as the Ras (Duke) Hamasien during the 19th century. Raesi Woldemichael was born in Hazega village in Hamassien. He is from the wider Tigrinya ethnic group, the eldest son of Abeto Solomon Zerai of Hazega and Woizero Eleni. Today he is widely celebrated as a hero standing for Eritrean sovereignty.

Life
Raesi Woldemichael was born into one of the traditional ruling families of Medri Bahri, the House of Hazega. His mother was Emebet Ilen, the governor of Hamsen. Upon the death of Emperor Tewodros II in 1868, then ruler of Tigray (and later Emperor), Dejazmatch Yohannes IV appointed his ally Woldemichael the Governor of Hamasien and Seraye. In doing so, Tewodros' former appointee Dejazmatch Hailu Teweldemedhin of the rival House of Tsazega was replaced.

Under the leadership of now Emperor Yohannes IV, Woldemichael fought in the Battle of Gundet against Egyptian forces under Khedive Isma'il Pasha, who sought to bring the entire Nile River Basin under his rule. The Khedive entrusted the Danish mercenary Colonel Adolf Arendrup to annex Hamasien and Seraye, and then proceed towards Adwa. Following some minor skirmishes, the forces of the Khedive met the Abyssinian forces at Gundet on the morning of 16 November 1875. Ras Alula took command of the left flank, the forces of Yohannes on the right, with Woldemichael taking command of the center and rear in light of his greater knowledge of the area. The Egyptians were tricked into a narrow and steep valley and were wiped out by the Abyssinian gunners surrounding the valley from the surrounding mountains. Virtually the entire Egyptian force, along with its many officers of European and North American background were killed. News of this huge defeat was suppressed in Egypt for fear that it would undermine the government of the Khedive.

However, Woldemichael resented the nature of the Emperor's interference in the semi-autonomous Medri Bahri and feared that Yohannes intended to re-appoint Woldemichael's rival Hailu as Governor. Before the Battle of Gura ensued, he rebelled against Yohannes and sided with the Egyptians. Following the defeat of the Egyptians at Gura, Woldemichael went into open revolt against Yohannes, vowing to destroy his rival Hailu in the process, culminating in the defeat of Hailu during the Battle of Weki Duba.

Unable to consolidate power in the northern provinces, Yohannes sent messengers to Woldemichael offering to forgive his past crimes if he submitted to him. Woldemichael adamantly refused, leading to Yohannes' appointment of loyalist Ras Baryau Gebretsadiq as Governor of Hamasien. Raesi Baryau governorship was however shortlived, with Woldemichael confronting and soundly defeating him at Biet Mekae near Asmara. Yohannes then appointed Ras Alula as Governor, tasking him to end Woldemichael's revolt. When Raesi Alula became aware of the difficulties fighting Woldemichael, once again a truce was offered to Woldemichael, with Ras Alula swearing on The Bible that he would not attack. On this occasion, Woldemichael agreed to peace terms and travelled to Axum, Ethiopia to sign a peace treaty. However, Alula broke his promise (betrayal) and imprisoned Raesi Woldemichael, allowing Alula to rule Hamasien with little opposition afterwards. Woldemichael lived in forced retirement in Axum until his death in 1906.

References

19th-century Eritrean people
1820 births
1906 deaths